Abdessalem Arous (born 14 January 1979) is a Tunisian judoka.

Achievements

References

External links
 

1979 births
Living people
Tunisian male judoka
Judoka at the 2000 Summer Olympics
Olympic judoka of Tunisia
African Games medalists in judo
Competitors at the 2003 All-Africa Games
African Games silver medalists for Tunisia
20th-century Tunisian people
21st-century Tunisian people